Nicholas II Chrysoberges (ʻgolden wandʼ), (? – 16 December 991) was Ecumenical Patriarch of Constantinople from 984 to 991.

In 980, during the reign of Emperor Basil II, when Nicholas Chrysoberges was Ecumenical Patriarch, the Archangel Gabriel was believed to have appeared in the guise of a monk to the disciple of a certain monk at the Monastery of the Pantocrator in Mount Athos. The monk reported that the angel sang a new verse of the matins hymn, recorded on a slate still held at the monastery. Nicholas received the relic in the cathedral of Hagia Sophia. The Axion Estin is still sung in Orthodox services.

Nicholas' tenure also saw the completion of the Christianization of the Rus' and the appointment of the first metropolitan for Rus', Michael the Syrian.

Patriarch Nicholas was later canonized and is commemorated by both the Roman Catholic Church and the Eastern Orthodox Church on 16 December.

References 

10th-century patriarchs of Constantinople